Marjorie Christine Bates R.A. (1882–1962) was born in Kings Newton, near Melbourne, Derbyshire. She was a painter who exhibited at the Royal Academy in London and Paris and achieved a moderate living from her paintings.

Biography
Bates was the daughter of George and Emily Bates who had made money from the sale of mosquito netting. Her family moved to Wilford in Nottinghamshire where she attended the Nottingham School of Art. She was a distant relative of both Laura Knight and Harold Gresley. She died in 1962.

References

External links
 Example prints
 Johnson, J.: British artists, 1880–1940. Woodbridge, Suffolk: Antique Collectors’ Club, 1976. – . – (Dictionary of British Art; vol. 5)
 Waters, G.M.: Dictionary of British artists working 1900–1950. Eastbourne: Eastbourne Fine Art, 1975.
 Benezit, E.: Dictionnaire critique et documentaire des peintres, sculpteurs, dessinateurs et graveurs. Nouvelle edition ... [editorial direction]: J. Busse. T. 1: Aa-Beduschi. Paris: Grund, 1999. – .

1880s births
1962 deaths
20th-century English painters
20th-century English women artists
English women painters
People from King's Newton